Mercedes Department is a  department of Corrientes Province in Argentina.

It is the site of the Battle of Caaguazú during the Argentine Civil War in 1841.

Settlements
Felipe Yofré
Mariano I. Loza
Mercedes

External links
Mercedes website 

Departments of Corrientes Province